Westerfield is a village in Suffolk, England. It lies about two miles north of the centre of Ipswich in the East Suffolk District, and is served by Westerfield railway station on the Ipswich–Lowestoft East Suffolk Line.

Amenities
Westerfield has two public houses, The Swan in northern Westerfield and The Westerfield Railway in the south. Both serve meals and contribute much to local social activity.

Central Westerfield has a village green adjacent to the medieval parish Church of St Mary Magdalene, where the East Anglian cleric and Hebrew scholar Cyprian Thomas Rust (1808–1895) is among those buried. It has fine stained glass windows, of which St Mary of Magdala was designed by William Morris.

Population
The population of Westerfield with Culpho was estimated at 486 in 2019 and measured at 442 in the 2011 Census.

References

External links

Westerfield Village

Villages in Suffolk
Civil parishes in Suffolk